Erik J. Fish (born May 19, 1952) is a Canadian former competition swimmer and backstroke specialist who competed for his native country at the 1972 Summer Olympics in Munich, West Germany.  As a member of the Canadian third-place team in the men's 4x100-metre medley relay, he won a bronze medal alongside teammates William Mahony, Bruce Robertson and Robert Kasting.

See also
 List of Commonwealth Games medallists in swimming (men)
 List of Olympic medalists in swimming (men)

References
 Canadian Olympic Committee
 sports-reference

1952 births
Living people
Sportspeople from Medicine Hat
Canadian male backstroke swimmers
Olympic bronze medalists for Canada
Olympic bronze medalists in swimming
Olympic swimmers of Canada
Sportspeople from Alberta
Swimmers at the 1972 Summer Olympics
Yale Bulldogs men's swimmers
Swimmers at the 1970 British Commonwealth Games
Commonwealth Games bronze medallists for Canada
Medalists at the 1972 Summer Olympics
Commonwealth Games medallists in swimming
Universiade medalists in swimming
Universiade bronze medalists for Canada
Medalists at the 1973 Summer Universiade
Medallists at the 1970 British Commonwealth Games